Thomas Hart Seymour (September 29, 1807September 3, 1868) was an American lawyer and Democratic Party politician who served as the 36th governor of Connecticut from 1850 to 1853 and as minister to Russia from 1853 to 1858. He was the leader of the peace settlement in the Democratic Party, and narrowly lost the April 1863 gubernatorial election.

Early life
Born in Hartford, Connecticut, to Major Henry Seymour and Jane Ellery, Seymour was sent to public schools as a child and graduated from Middletown Military Academy in Middletown, Connecticut, in 1829. He studied law and was admitted to the bar in 1833, commencing practice in Hartford.

Career
A judge of probate from 1836 to 1838, Seymour was also Editor of the Jeffersonian from 1837 to 1838. In 1842, he was elected to the U.S. House of Representatives and served one term from 1843 to 1845, declining reelection in 1844.

During the Mexican–American War, Seymour was commissioned as a major in the Connecticut Infantry on March 16, 1846, later recommissioned to the new 9th United States Infantry on April 9, 1847. Due to his courageous leadership at the Battle of Chapultepec, he was promoted to lieutenant colonel of the 12th Infantry under Colonel Milledge L. Bonham on August 12, 1847.

After the war, Seymour made an unsuccessful run for Governor of Connecticut in 1849, but was elected governor by the Connecticut General Assembly the next year in 1850. He was re-elected in 1851, 1852 and 1853. He served as an 1852 presidential elector, endorsing Franklin Pierce and, in return for his support, Seymour was appointed to serve as minister to Russia and resigned the governorship shortly after being reelected to a fourth term. He accepted the commission of Minister to Russia from President Franklin Pierce. He resigned from the governorship on October 13, 1853, and spent the next four years in Russia, where he built a warm and ongoing alliance with the Czar Nicholas and his son. He served in this position until 1858 when President James Buchanan replaced him with Francis W. Pickens. In Russia, his attaches included Daniel Coit Gilman and Andrew Dickson White.

Seymour made two unsuccessful attempts to return to the governorship in 1860 and 1863 and unsuccessfully sought the Democratic nomination for President of the United States at the 1864 Democratic National Convention, losing to Civil War general George B. McClellan.

Death and legacy

Seymour died of typhoid fever, in Hartford, Connecticut, on September 3, 1868 (age 60 years, 340 days). He is interred at Cedar Hill Cemetery. In 1850 the town of Humphreysville, Connecticut—then contemplating a change of name—was renamed Seymour in his honor.

References

Further reading
 Cowden, Joanna D.  "The Politics of Dissent: Civil War Democrats in Connecticut," New England Quarterly (1983) 56#4 pp. 538–554 DOI: 10.2307/365104 in JSTOR
 Niven, John. Connecticut for the Union: The Role of the State in the Civil War (Yale University Press, 1965)
 Talmadge, John E. "A Peace Movement in Civil War Connecticut." New England Quarterly (1964): 306-321. in JSTOR
 Warshauer, Matthew. Connecticut in the American Civil War: Slavery, Sacrifice, and Survival (Wesleyan University Press, 2011)

External links
 
 Retrieved on 2009-05-26
 Thomas Hart Seymour from "A History of the Seymour Family" (by George Dudley Seymour and Donald Lines Jacobus, 1939)
The Political Graveyard
Govtrack US Congress

1807 births
1868 deaths
19th-century American diplomats
19th-century American male writers
19th-century American newspaper editors
19th-century American politicians
Ambassadors of the United States to Russia
American male journalists
American military personnel of the Mexican–American War
Burials at Cedar Hill Cemetery (Hartford, Connecticut)
Candidates in the 1864 United States presidential election
Connecticut lawyers
Democratic Party members of the United States House of Representatives from Connecticut
Democratic Party governors of Connecticut
Members of the Connecticut General Assembly Council of Assistants (1662–1818)
Military personnel from Connecticut
Politicians from Hartford, Connecticut
United States Army officers
19th-century American lawyers
Copperheads (politics)